Syamak Zafarzadeh (born 5 May 1964) is an Iranian former cyclist. He competed in two events at the 1988 Summer Olympics.

References

1964 births
Living people
Iranian male cyclists
Olympic cyclists of Iran
Cyclists at the 1988 Summer Olympics
Cyclists at the 1986 Asian Games
Place of birth missing (living people)
Asian Games competitors for Iran
20th-century Iranian people